Franklin  may refer to:

People 
 Franklin (given name)
 Franklin (surname)
 Franklin (class), a member of a historical English social class

Places

Australia 
 Franklin, Tasmania, a township
 Division of Franklin, federal electoral division in Tasmania
 Division of Franklin (state), state electoral division in Tasmania
 Franklin, Australian Capital Territory, a suburb in the Canberra district of Gungahlin
 Franklin River, river of Tasmania
 Franklin Sound, waterway of Tasmania

Canada 
 District of Franklin, a former district of the Northwest Territories
 Franklin, Quebec, a municipality in the Montérégie region
 Rural Municipality of Franklin, Manitoba
 Franklin, Manitoba, an unincorporated community in the Rural Municipality of Rosedale, Manitoba
 Franklin Glacier Complex, a volcano in southwestern British Columbia
 Franklin Range, a mountain range on Vancouver Island, British Columbia
 Franklin River (Vancouver Island), British Columbia
 Franklin Strait, Nunavut

Cayman Islands 
 Franklin's Forest, Grand Cayman

New Zealand 
 Franklin District, a former territorial authority area
 Franklin (local board area), a local government area
 Franklin (New Zealand electorate), a former parliamentary electorate

Poland 
 Franklin, Łódź Voivodeship (central Poland), a village

United States 
 State of Franklin (1784–1789), an unrecognized, autonomous territory that later became part of Tennessee
 Franklin, Alabama, Macon County
 Franklin, Monroe County, Alabama
 Franklin, Arkansas
 Franklin, California (disambiguation)
 Franklin, Connecticut
 Franklin, Georgia
 Franklin, Idaho
 Franklin, Illinois
 Franklin, Indiana, Johnson County
 Franklin, Wayne County, Indiana
 Franklin, Iowa
 Franklin, Kansas, Crawford County
 Franklin, Douglas County, Kansas, a ghost town
 Franklin, Kentucky
 Franklin, Louisiana
 Franklin, Maine
 Franklin, Massachusetts
 Franklin, Michigan
 Franklin, Minnesota
 Franklin, Missouri
 Franklin, Nebraska
 Franklin, New Hampshire
 Franklin, New Jersey 
 Franklin, New York (disambiguation)
 Franklin, North Carolina
 Franklin, Ohio
 Franklin, Pennsylvania (disambiguation)
 Franklin, Tennessee
 Franklin, Texas
 Franklin, Vermont
 Franklin, Virginia
 Franklin, West Virginia
 Franklin, Wisconsin (disambiguation)
 Franklin Mountains (Alaska), a mountain range
 Mount Franklin (New Hampshire), in the White Mountains
 Franklin County (disambiguation)
 Franklin Falls (disambiguation)
 Franklin Township (disambiguation)

Arts and entertainment 
 Franklin (Peanuts), a character in the comic strip Peanuts
 Franklin (TV series),  children's television series about a turtle named Franklin
 The title character of Franklin the Turtle (books), the book series on which the TV series was based
 Franklin Delano Bluth, a puppet from the TV show Arrested Development
 Roosevelt Franklin, a former character on Sesame Street
 Franklin Bordeau, a character in the manga series Hunter × Hunter
 The title character of Franklin & Bash, a TV series that began in 2011
 Franklin, character in the comic book Monica and Friends
 Franklin, the mascot of the Philadelphia 76ers

Businesses
 Franklin Electronic Publishers, an electronic reference company and former computer manufacturer
 Franklin Engine Company, a manufacturer of aircraft engines
 The Franklin Mint, a producer of collectibles

Schools 
 Franklin University Switzerland, an American university in Lugano, Switzerland
 Franklin College (disambiguation)
 Franklin High School (disambiguation)

Ships 
 
 , an Australian Navy steel screw steamer
 , an Australian marine research vessel 1985–2002
 SS , a seagoing rescue tug
 , an 1850s American steamboat
 , captured by the British and sailed as HMS Canopus

Transportation 
 Franklin (automobile), an American automobile
 Franklin (CTrain), a train station in Calgary, Alberta, Canada
 Franklin station (Sacramento), a light rail station in Sacramento, California, US
 Franklin metro station, a metro station in Santiago, Chile

Other uses 
 Battle of Franklin (disambiguation)
 Franklin (crater), a lunar impact crater
 Franklin (tree), a giant sequoia in Sequoia National Park, California, US
 Franklin (unit), a unit of electrical charge
 Franklin Institute, a museum in Philadelphia

See also 
 The Franklin's Tale, one of the Canterbury Tales
 Franklyn (name)
 Franquelin (disambiguation)